Deschampsia cespitosa, commonly known as tufted hairgrass or tussock grass, is a perennial tufted plant in the grass family Poaceae. Distribution of this species is widespread including the eastern and western coasts of North America, parts of South America, Eurasia and Australia.

The species is cultivated as an ornamental garden plant, and numerous cultivars are available. The cultivars 'Goldschleier' and 'Goldtau'  have gained the Royal Horticultural Society's Award of Garden Merit.

It is a larval host to the Juba skipper and the umber skipper.

Description
A distinguishing feature is the upper surface of the leaf blade which feels rough and can cut in one direction, but is smooth in the opposite direction. The dark green upper sides of the leaves are deeply grooved.

It flowers from June until August.

It can be found on all types of grassland, although it prefers poorly drained soil. It forms a major component of the British NVC community MG9  - Holcus lanatus to Deschampsia cespitosa mesotrophic grasslands.  It can exist up to altitudes of 4000 ft. Typical native grass associates in the western North American coastal prairies, such as the California coastal prairie, are Festuca californica, Festuca idahoensis, Danthonia californica,  and Nassella pulchra.

Subspecies
 Deschampsia cespitosa subsp. cespitosa (synonyms: Deschampsia bottnica (Wahlenb.) Trin.; Deschampsia littoralis (Gaudin) Reut.)

Gallery

See also
Ornamental grass

References

External links

Jepson Manual. 1993. Jepson Manual Treatment: Deschampsia cespitosa
USDA Plants Profile for Deschampsia cespitosa
UC Photos gallery of Deschampsia cespitosa 

cespitosa
Bunchgrasses of North America
Bunchgrasses of Asia
Bunchgrasses of Europe
Bunchgrasses of South America
Grasses of North America
Grasses of Oceania
Grasses of Canada
Grasses of the United States
Flora of Australia
Taxa named by Carl Linnaeus
Taxa named by Palisot de Beauvois
Garden plants of North America
Garden plants of South America